Craspedochiton rubiginosus oliveri is a subspecies of chiton in the family Acanthochitonidae.

References
 Powell A. W. B., New Zealand Mollusca, William Collins Publishers Ltd, Auckland, New Zealand 1979 

Acanthochitonidae
Chitons of New Zealand